Mark de Mori (born 11 February 1982) is a Croatian professional boxer of Australian descent, who fights at heavyweight.

Early life and amateur career 
De Mori grew up in the suburbs of Perth. He was supposedly deaf until the age of four and suffered chronic asthma attacks throughout his childhood and early teenage years. Whilst recovering, he became increasingly drawn to boxing and taught himself to box by watching videos and attempting to recreate the moves he saw in his father's garage. De Mori took part in 11 fights during his time as an amateur, winning all.

Although lessened, De Mori's asthma remains. He says that his private gym, the Odjebi training centre in Split, "has a good climate and is really good for my asthma".

De Mori lives in Croatia.

Professional career 
De Mori turned professional at the age of 22. He knocked out five of his first six opponents before taking an 18-month break from the sport.

De Mori has occasionally been accused of adopting an 'arrogant' style in the ring, as he tends to keep his fists low, rather than in front of his face. The stance is similar to that of famous American boxers from De Mori's childhood that he attempts to replicate. The stance, which has proven successful, has angered previous opponents.

In 2007, De Mori signed a three-year deal with prominent boxing promoter Don King. King cited "youth and exciting style" as the reason he put faith in De Mori, as he slowly worked his way up the ranks. One year into his deal with King, De Mori scored an eight-round win by unanimous decision over Ed Mahone in New Zealand. Mahone had been the favourite heading into the fight but was worn down by De Mori's 'jab and move' approach.

In 2009, De Mori won a further two US fights, both by knockout as a result of body blows, ranking him the number 17 heavyweight in the world by the World Boxing Council and further increasing global interest in his potential as a heavyweight contender.

In 2014 De Mori scored an incredible first-round TKO victory over Bosnian Zeljko Bojic. Many promoters and managers now took inevitable interest in De Mori as his power was almost unprecedented.

In 2015 in Niedersachsen, Germany, he stopped German Marcel Zeller in less than a round.

Mark has been ranked as high as 7 in the world with the WBA and 15 with the WBC as well as winning the WBU and WBF world titles.

De Mori Vs. David Haye

On 24 November 2015 it was announced at a press conference that De Mori would be the comeback opponent of former heavyweight champion David Haye. The bout took place on 16 January 2016 at The O2 Arena in London and was promoted by Salter Brothers Entertainment. De Mori hinted he would try to exploit Haye's weakness of having six pins in his right shoulder. De Mori looked bothered by the first jab Haye threw and thereafter it was one-way traffic. Haye, set up the finish with huge overhand right and De Mori was unconscious before he hit the canvas with 49 seconds left in the round. De Mori was ranked 10th by the WBA before his defeat to Haye.

Split with King 
In 2015, De Mori was given an early release from his contract with Don King and "a lump of cash" after Canadian Bermane Stiverne, another client of King's, failed to retain the WBC heavyweight title. King reportedly had De Mori as the next challenger for Stiverne prior to his defeat to Deontay Wilder in January 2015, and according to De Mori this was the reason for his contract release.

Mark has been ranked as high as 7 in the world with the WBA and 15 with the WBC as well as winning the WBU and WBF world titles.

References

External links
 
 

1982 births
Living people
Australian male boxers
Australian expatriate sportspeople in Croatia
Sportspeople from Perth, Western Australia
Australian people of Italian descent
Heavyweight boxers